Wapato (YTB-788) was a United States Navy  named for Wapato, Washington.

Construction

The contract for Wapato was awarded 14 January 1965. She was laid down on 14 January 1966 at Marinette, Wisconsin, by Marinette Marine and launched 18 April 1966.

Operational history

Delivered to the U.S. Navy on 21 June 1966, Wapato was assigned to the 10th Naval District and operated out of San Juan, Puerto Rico, aiding ships in berthing and docking maneuvers and providing waterfront fire protection.

Stricken on 25 April 1996, Wapato was sold on 27 December 2002.

Repowered and chartered for a time to SeaBulk Towing of Florida as Osprey, ex-Wapato is currently active in commercial service as Timothy McAllister.

References

External links
 

Natick-class large harbor tugs
Ships built by Marinette Marine
1966 ships